Jarrett Pekelo Kahanuolaokalani "Anu" Solomon Jr. (born November 5, 1994) is a former American football quarterback for the Arizona Wildcats and Baylor Bears. He began his college football career at Arizona, before deciding to transfer after his senior year to Baylor. He decided to withdraw from Baylor on October 31, 2017, after suffering a concussion.

Early years
Solomon is Hawaiian. He was born in Honolulu, Hawaii, and he moved to Las Vegas, Nevada at age 10. He grew up with an interest in sports. His father, Jarrett Sr., was an all star, all-state linebacker at Farrington High School and attended San Jose State University. As a youngster, Anu played a variety of sports—baseball (pitcher), basketball (point guard) and football (linebacker and quarterback).

Solomon graduated from Bishop Gorman High School in Las Vegas, Nevada in 2013. In four seasons, he passed for 5,234 yards and 49 touchdowns, and rushed for another 1,263 yards and 19 more scores in leading the four-time champion Bishop Gorman Gaels to an overall record of 43–3.

As a freshman, Bishop Gorman won its first 12 games. Solomon passed for 2,026 yards with 19 touchdowns, and had 78 yards rushing with 3 touchdowns. He led Bishop Gorman to a 12–1 record.

In his sophomore year, Solomon passed for 2,419 yards and 42 touchdowns, and also rushed for 276 yards and two scores. Bishop Gorman finished with a 13–2 record.

Solomon passed for 2,770 yards and 41 touchdowns in his junior year of high school. He  also rushed for 389 yards and six scores. Bishop Gorman finished with a 15–1 record.

Solomon, in his senior year, became the most accomplished passer in Nevada history. Quarterbacking the Bishop Gorman Gaels since his freshman season, he helped in winning the school a record four state titles. In his final high school season, Solomon passed for 2,271 yards and threw 30 touchdowns, while rushing for 179 yards and eight scores. He led Bishop Gorman to a 12–1 record and won a record fourth state title. With 56 wins as a starter, Solomon is the winningest QB in high school football history.

Coming out of high school, Solomon received scholarship offers from Football Bowl Subdivision schools Arizona, Arizona State, Brigham Young University, Colorado, Illinois, Purdue, Utah, Oregon State, Hawaii, Washington, Washington State, Wisconsin and the University of Nevada at Las Vegas. Solomon made a verbal commitment to Arizona on National Signing Day and signed with Arizona in May 2012. He was ranked by Rivals.com as a four-star recruit and the second best dual-threat quarterback in his class.

College career

Arizona
Solomon accepted an athletic scholarship to attend University of Arizona, where he played for coach Rich Rodriguez's Arizona Wildcats team from 2013 to 2016. Solomon was redshirted during the 2013 season and did not play in any games behind senior quarterback B.J. Denker. He made the travel squad after enrolling with the college in January.

Prior to the 2014 season, Solomon was named Arizona's starting quarterback. In his college debut, he completed 25–44, 425 yards, 4 touchdown passes along against the UNLV in a 58–13 victory. Solomon was launched into the national scene after he led Arizona to a 31–24 victory over #2 Oregon in Eugene, OR. Solomon helped lead the team to a 10–2 regular season record to win Pac-12 South division championship for the first time in school history, in a 42–35 win over Pac-12 South rival Arizona State, including a 59–13 loss to Oregon (rematch from 31 to 24 Arizona win) in the Pac-12 Football Championship Game. After a 10–3 regular season, the Wildcats were selected to play in the Fiesta Bowl, a New Year Six game in the CFB Playoff, against Boise State. Boise State would win the game 38–30, giving Solomon his only loss as a starter during his college career. Solomon finished the season with 3,793 passing yards, 28 touchdown passes and 9 interceptions.

In 2015, Solomon would enter his redshirt sophomore year as the starting quarterback for the Wildcats. Arizona entered the 2015 season ranked No. 22 by the Associated Press and Coaches Poll. In the season opener, Solomon completed 22 of 36 passes for 229 yards and four touchdowns as Arizona defeated UTSA 34–16. He finished the season with 6,460 career passing yards, which is fourth-most in school history, and 48 passing touchdowns, which is third-most all-time. Started and played 11 games, missing contests at Stanford (10/3) and ASU (11/21) due to injury. Also missed second half against UCLA (9/26) and much of fourth quarter against Utah (11/14). Missed time did not prevent him from improving his completion percentage (62.1 percent) and efficiency (146.98) numbers from a breakout freshman season. He had an average of 242.5 yards per game was boosted late in season over final three starts. Averaged 319 yards per game and completed 67 percent of passes in those contests against USC (11/7), Utah (11/14) and New Mexico (12/19). Only two 300-yard passing games of season came in last three outings. He had set a school record for most attempts to begin a season without an interception (210) and saw another program record of 233 overall attempts without a pick come to an end at Washington (10/31) He had a season high for passing yards came at USC (352), while twice tossed four touchdown passes (UTSA, 9/3; Nevada, 9/12). Rushed for scores against NAU (9/19), Utah (11/14) and New Mexico in the Gildan New Mexico Bowl (12/19). Netted 86 yards on 12 rushes with a scored in upset of No. 10 Utah. Tossed multiple touchdown passes in six games, suffering first career defeat (at USC) in 13 games when throwing at least two touchdowns.  Was named to several preseason watch lists, including the Manning Award, the Maxwell Award, the Davey O’Brien Award and the Walter Camp Player of the Year watch list.

Was named to several preseason watch lists, including the Manning Award, the Maxwell Award, the Davey O’Brien Award and the Walter Camp Player of the Year watch list. He finished the season with 6,922 career passing yards, which is fourth-most in school history, and 49 passing touchdowns, which is third-most all-time. Started and played 4 games, he missed seven contests including Grambling State, Hawaii, Washington, at UCLA, at Utah, USC and ASU due to injury.

He finished his career 17–13 as a starter at Arizona and completed 562 of 851 passes for 7,964 yards, 49 touchdown pass and 28 interceptions. On December 13, 2016, it was announced that Solomon intended to transfer from Arizona, graduating early to be eligible to play in 2017.

Baylor
On January 9, 2017, Solomon committed to Baylor University for the 2017 season as a graduate transfer.

Solomon struggled in two games for Baylor. He suffered a concussion during the Bears 17–10 loss to UTSA on September 9, 2017.

On October 31, 2017, head coach Matt Rhule announced that Solomon would be withdrawing from Baylor due to his concussion.

Statistics

Source:

Year* 2013 – red shirt

Awards and honors
High School Awards & Honors
Prep Top-150 Dream Team
Lemming Top Player (Combo Passer) selection
Three-time all-conference (Division I/I Sunset)
Three-time all-region
Four-time all-state selection (NV)
Three-time MaxPreps All-American
Four-Time State Champion 
2014
 Polynesian College Football Player of the Year finalists
 All-Pac-12 Honorable Mention 
 2x Coaches Offensive Player of the Week
 3x Manning Award of the Week
 Athlon Sports' National Freshman of the Week
 2x Davey O'Brien Award QB of the Week
 Athlon Sports' Pac12 Player of the Week
 Vegas Seven- Las Vegas Bowl Pac-12 Player of the Week, Sep 24
Heisman Candidate 
2015
 Maxwell Award Preseason Watchlist
 Davey O'Brien Award Preseason Watchlist
 Walter Camp Award Preseason Watchlist
 Polynesian College Football Player of the Year watchlists 
 2015 New Mexico Bowl Offensive MVP

2016
Maxwell Award Watch list (2)
Walter Camp Award Watchlist (2)
 Polynesian College Football Player of the Year Award Watchlist (2)
Davey O'Brien Award Watch list (2)

†Shared award

2017

• Maxwell Award Watchlist

• Davey O’Brien Award Watchlist

• Polynesian College Football Player of the Year Award Watchlist

Personal life
Anu is the son of Jarrett Sr. and Jamielyn Solomon and he has six siblings. His given name is Jarrett Pekelo Kahanuolaokalani Jr. He has shortened his middle name to Anu because his young cousins could not pronounce Kahanu. At college, he majored in Economy and Sport industry.

References

External links
Arizona Wildcats bio

1994 births
Living people
Sportspeople from the Las Vegas Valley
Players of American football from Hawaii
Players of American football from Nevada
American football quarterbacks
Bishop Gorman High School alumni
Arizona Wildcats football players
Baylor Bears football players